Galečka Ćuprija is a stone bridge over the sinking river Šuica, near the village of Galečić, in the heart of the Šuica Valley, which is in the northwestern part of Duvanjsko Polje, in Bosnia and Herzegovina.

See also
Šuica
List of bridges in Bosnia and Herzegovina

References

Stone arch bridges in Bosnia and Herzegovina